NODE+ (wireless sensor platform) is a first-generation handheld sensor measuring 1 inch in diameter and 3.75 inches wide that communicates wirelessly through low-energy Bluetooth 4.0 with Apple iOS devices.

NODE+ has been attributed in the media as a “Swiss Army knife of sensors,” similar in appearance to the “tricorder from Star Trek,” and as a “powerhouse of quality sensors”  that can “measure anything.”

In September 2014, 16 interchangeable sensor modules were available for purchase that can detect color, gases, ambient temperature, barometric pressure, motion, surface temperature and other qualities.

Mobile applications that display the data transmitted by the NODE can be developed through an open application programming interface (API), although mobile app developers must obtain a commercial license from Variable Inc. prior to selling a mobile app that uses Node+ sensors for commercial purposes.

Node+ is available in educational settings through a partnership with Vernier Software & Technology. NODE+ is being sold for use in classrooms and educational institutions. NODE+ is also being used to support a variety of academic research studies. Additionally, NODE+ is being used as a platform to help industries worldwide develop Internet of Things (IoT) strategies.

NODE+ is manufactured in the United States of America.

History
The NODE+ was invented and produced in 2011 by George Yu, Ph.D. in his home in Chattanooga, Tennessee.   Prior to founding Variable Technologies LLC as CEO, Yu worked on research and development projects with NASA and the Department of Homeland Security.

NODE+ raised $76,340 on Kickstarter, $26,340 above its goal of $50,000 on March 23, 2012.

CHROMA, a color-matching module, raised $39,473 on Kickstarter, $24,473 over its goal on December 7, 2012.

Variable Inc. opened a second Knoxville, Tennessee office in December 2012. This office handles business development and government relations.

At the June 2013 Cisco Live U.S. event in Orlando, Florida, Cisco Chief Futurist David Evans demonstrated NODE+ as part of a talk about using technology in an “Internet of Things” strategy, in front of an audience of approximately 20,000 people and more than 200,000 through a webcast.

In September 2013, Variable Inc. announced the release of an Android-compatible NODE+ wireless sensor platform. The device had been only iOS compatible.

NODE+, a carbon dioxide sensing module, one of six different gas sensors in the OXA sensor family, raised $26,046 on Kickstarter, $1,046 over its goal on December 31, 2013.

In June 2014, Variable Inc. launched an online hackathon competition entitled HACKANODE.

It appears at this time (9/13/2018) that Node is no longer available.

Hardware
The base unit, NODE+, includes a 9-axis motion engine: a 3-axis gyroscope, a 3-axis accelerometer and a 3-axis magnetometer, as well as 16MB of onboard storage space. The NODE+ has dimmable blue LEDs and two module ports contains a crypto chip on the firmware. It communicates with Bluetooth 2.1 or Bluetooth Low Energy. The lithium polymer battery in the device has a battery life of 12–14 hours with continuous Bluetooth use (54 days in standby mode) and can be charged through the micro-USB port.

Mobile applications

GTI Spindle VibePro: A vibration analysis diagnostic app that uses NODE+THERMA to check the surface temperature of rotational machinery.

Velos: A color matching and collecting application for the NODE+CHROMA Bluetooth interchangeable sensor platform.

Cargosense: A data and analytics service that delivers total visibility for shipped goods intended for the healthcare industry.

Vernier Graphical Analysis: Vernier Graphical Analysis and NODE+ are used by students to collect, analyze, and share sensor data in math and science classrooms.

Little Lives: Little Lives allows school personnel to check students into the classroom and detect oncoming fevers by using NODE+THERMA to record their forehead temperatures.

LRV Guru: The LRV Guru app helps calculate color contrast ratios. Color samples can be scanned with a NODE+CHROMA or manually entered using manufacturer LRV data.

Paint Pro and Paint Pro Classic: Paint Pro uses NODE+CHROMA version 1.0 and 1.1 to compare and match paint colors between different manufacturers.

Scientific Sci-Fi Scanner: NODE+ sensor is an interactive scanner that uses information and data from NASA to give you information about your surroundings using the sensors on your phone.

Aeronaut: An analog flight instrument that uses NODE+CLIMA as a variometer and altimeter.

WKC Fix-O-Meter: This app teaches overhead stability and safety to kettlebell lifters and was originally developed for world champion kettlebell lifter Valery Fedorenko.

References

Smartphones
Sensors
Internet of things
Kickstarter-funded products